Peter B. Gillis (born December 19, 1952) is an American comic book writer best known for his work at Marvel Comics and First Comics in the mid-1980s, including the series Strikeforce: Morituri and the digitally drawn comic series Shatter.

Biography
Peter B. Gillis' first work in the comics industry was as a freelance writer for Marvel Comics. His first published comics story was "Saturday Night Furor" in Captain America #224 (Aug. 1978). He then wrote various issues of Marvel Two-In-One, What If...?, and Super-Villain Team-Up from 1978 to 1980. The irregular publishing frequency of the final issues of Super-Villain Team-Up was due to a legal maneuver to prevent DC Comics from trademarking the term "supervillain". Starting in 1980, Gillis then worked as editorial director for the Florida-based publisher New Media Publishing's new line of magazines; he left that position in June 1981.

He is best known for the digital comic Shatter (1985–1988) and First Comics' Warp (1983–1985). Gillis co-created Strikeforce: Morituri (1986–1988) with artist Brent Anderson. Gillis wrote the entire runs of Micronauts: The New Voyages (1984–1986) and Strange Tales vol. 2 (1987–1988); other Marvel work included numerous issues of What If (1980–1984), The Defenders (1984–1986), The Eternals vol. 2 (1985–1986), Doctor Strange vol. 2 #76–81 (1986–1987) and Doctor Strange, Sorcerer Supreme #1–4 (1988–1989). The Defenders was Gillis's first ongoing assignment; he recounted, "I had been working for a while at Marvel, and was constantly pumping for more work, and specifically a series of my own. So when I heard DeMatteis was leaving Defenders, I was in [editor] Carl Potts' office like a shot, and I got the gig."

His creations for other companies include Blaze Barlow and the Eternity Command and the Black Flame for First Comics; and Gammarauders, a tie-in to the Gamma World role-playing game, for DC Comics' short-lived TSR Games line. He also wrote the science-fiction miniseries Tailgunner Jo with art by Tom Artis for DC.

Gillis returned to comics in 2010 when he wrote the six-issue comic adaptation of Peter S. Beagle's The Last Unicorn for IDW Publishing.

Bibliography

Comico
 Justice Machine #13 (1988)

DC Comics
 Gammarauders #1–10 (1989)  
 Tailgunner Jo #1–6 (1988–1989)  
 Teen Titans Spotlight #20 (Cyborg) (1988)

First Comics
 First Adventures #1–4 (1985–1986)  
 Grimjack #7, 31 (1985–1987)  
 Jon Sable, Freelance #25 (1985)  
 Mars #2–8 (1984)  
 Shatter #1–12 (1985–1987) 
 Starslayer #20–33 (1984–1985)  
 Warp #1–19, Special #1–3 (1983–1985)

IDW Publishing
 The Last Unicorn #1–6 (2010)

Marvel Comics

 Avengers Spotlight #21 (1989)  
 Bizarre Adventures #30 (1982)  
 Black Panther vol. 2 #1–4 (1988)  
 Captain America #224, 238–239, 246, Annual #7 (1978–1983)   
 The Defenders #131–152 (1984–1986)   
 Doctor Strange vol. 2 #74, 76–81 (1985–1987)  
 Doctor Strange, Sorcerer Supreme #1–4 (1988–1989)    
 Eternals vol. 2 #1–8 (1985–1986)  
 Iron Man Annual #5–6 (1982–1983)  
 John Carter, Warlord of Mars #28 (1979)  
 Marvel Comics Presents #20, 22, 61, 65 (1989–1990)  
 Marvel Fanfare #8 (Doctor Strange) (1983)  
 Marvel Premiere #54 (Caleb Hammer) (1980)  
 Marvel Super-Heroes vol. 2 #3 (1990)  
 Marvel Two-in-One #45, 51 (1978–1979)   
 Master of Kung Fu #102 (1981)  
 Micronauts #59 (1984)  
 Micronauts vol. 2 #1–20 (1984–1986)  
 Savage Sword of Conan #169 (1990)  
 Solo Avengers #16, 18, 20 (1989)  
 Strange Tales vol. 2 #1–19 (Doctor Strange) (1987–1988)   
 Strikeforce: Morituri #1–20 (1986–1988)  
 Super-Villain Team-Up #16–17 (1979–1980)   
 Thor Annual #12 (1984)  
 The Tomb of Dracula vol. 2 #5 (1980)
 What If...? #18–19, 23, 25, 29–30, 40, 42–47 (1979–1984)  
 What If Special #1 (1988)
 What The--?! #1–2, 5–6, 17  (1988–1992)

References

External links

Peter B. Gillis at Mike's Amazing World of Comics
Peter B. Gillis at the Unofficial Handbook of Marvel Comics Creators

1952 births
American comics writers
Living people
Marvel Comics writers
People from Elgin, Illinois
People from White Plains, New York
University of Chicago alumni